Parnassius hannyngtoni, the Hannyngton's Apollo, is a high-altitude butterfly which is found in India. It is a member of the snow Apollo genus (Parnassius) of the swallowtail family (Papilionidae). Some sources also spell the name as P. hunnygtoni. It is named after Frank Hannyngton who obtained the specimen from the Chumbi Valley.

Range
Northern slope of central Himalaya (Tibet). Previously known from the Chumbi Valley, northern part of India (Sikkim) which currently is occupied by China. It may be in Bhutan.

Description
Original description by Andrey Avinoff:

Status
This species is very rare and is protected by law in India.

See also
Papilionidae
List of butterflies of India
List of butterflies of India (Papilionidae)

References

 
 
 
 Sakai S., Inaoka S., Toshiaki A., Yamaguchi S., Watanabe Y., (2002) The Parnassiology. The Parnassius Butterflies, A Study in Evolution, Kodansha, Japan. 
 Weiss Jean-Claude, (1999) Parnassiinae of the World, Hillside Books, Canterbury, UK. ,

Further reading
sv:Parnassius hunnyngtoni - Swedish Wikipedia provides further references and synonymy

hannyngtoni
Fauna of Pakistan
Butterflies described in 1916